Interrogation is interviewing for the purpose of gaining information.

Interrogation or Interrogator or The Interrogation may also refer to:

 Interrogation (1979 film), a 1979 Soviet crime/drama film
 Interrogation (1982 film), a 1982 Polish drama film
 Interrogation (2016 film), an American action film
 The Interrogation (film) (Kuulustelu), a 2009 Finnish war film
 The Interrogation (2015 film) (Visaranai), a 2015 Indian docudrama crime-thriller film
 "The Interrogation" (Dragnet), an episode of the 1960s television series Dragnet
 Interrogation (TV series), a 2020 American true crime frame television series
 Le Procès-Verbal (English title: The Interrogation), the debut novel of J. M. G. Le Clézio

Other uses
 Interrogator (G.I. Joe), a fictional villain in the G.I. Joe universe, member of Cobra
Robert Maillet (born 1969), a professional wrestler once billed as The Interrogator

See also
 Interrogate (band), a heavy metal band from Northern Ireland
 The Interrogation (disambiguation)